Saxophonic is the seventh studio album by saxophone player Dave Koz. It was released by Capitol Records on  October 7, 2003. The album peaked at number 2 on Billboard Jazz Albums chart.

Track listing

Personnel 
 Dave Koz – alto saxophone (1, 2, 6, 7, 10, 11, 13), arrangements (1, 2, 4, 5, 6, 8-11), soprano saxophone (2, 4, 5, 7, 8, 10, 12), tenor saxophone (2, 3, 5, 7), horn arrangements (3), sax section (13)
 Jeff Lorber – Wurlitzer electric piano (1, 6), clavinet (1), additional keyboards (1, 6), electric guitar (1, 6), arrangements (1, 6)
 Carl Sturken – keyboards (2, 8, 9, 10), electric guitar (2), bass programming (2, 8, 9, 10), drum programming (2, 8, 9, 10), arrangements (2, 8, 9, 10), guitars (8), acoustic guitar (10)
 Brian Culbertson – keyboards (3, 12), synth bass (3), drum programming (3, 12), trombone (3), trumpet (3), arrangements (3, 12), horn arrangements (3), acoustic piano (12), sound effects (12)
 Jeff Koz – keyboards (4, 5, 7, 11), bass programming (4, 5, 7), drum programming (4, 5, 7), arrangements (4, 5, 7, 11), acoustic guitar (5), effects (7), nylon acoustic guitar (11)
 Brad Cole – acoustic piano (7), sax section arrangements (13)
 Charles Crawford – turntables (9), DJ effects (9)
 Norman Brown – guitar solo (1)
 Paul Jackson, Jr. – acoustic guitar (3), guitar pads (3), guitar effects (3)
 Tony Maiden – wah wah guitars (3), "funk" guitars (3), electric guitar (6)
 Michael Thompson – acoustic guitar (4, 5, 11, 12), electric guitar (4, 5, 7, 11, 12), guitar arrangements (4, 5, 7), guitar synthesizer (7), Ebow (12)
 Marc Antoine – nylon acoustic guitar solo (12)
 Alex Al – bass (1, 6), electric bass (3, 12)
 Nathan East – bass (4, 7), electric bass (11)
 John Robinson – drums (1, 6)
 Gary Novak – drums (7, 11)
 Lenny Castro – percussion (1, 4, 5, 7, 11)
 Bashiri Johnson – African percussion (12), vocal effects (12)
 Bill Reichenbach Jr. – trombone (1, 6)
 Jerry Hey – trumpet (1, 6), flugelhorn (1, 6), horn arrangements (1, 6)
 Chris Botti – trumpet (9)
 Evan Rogers – arrangements (2, 8, 9, 10), backing vocals (8), vocal effects (9), vocals (10), whistle (10)
 Larry Gold – string arrangements and conductor  (8)
 Jennie Lorenzo – cello (8)
 Peter Nocella – viola (8)
 Gloria Justin – violin (8)
 Emma Kummrow – violin (8)
 Igor Szwec – violin (8)
 Brian McKnight – lead vocals (2), backing vocals (2, 13), acoustic piano (13)
 Bobby Caldwell – backing vocals (6)
 John Stoddart – vocal effects (7)
 Javier – lead and backing vocals (8)

Handclaps on "Honey-Dipped"
 Janice Dela Cruz, Lois Gleckman, Liz Healy, Hyman Katz, Audrey Koz, Dave Koz, Jeff Lorber, Gary Morris, Mel Pearlman and Mark Tungwarapotwitan

Production 
 Dave Koz – executive producer, producer (1, 3-7, 11), co-producer (2, 8, 9, 10)
 Jeff Lorber – producer (1, 6), recording (1, 6)
 Evan Rogers – producer (2, 8, 9, 10)
 Carl Sturken – producer (2, 8, 9, 10)
 Brian Culbertson – producer (3, 12), recording (3, 12)
 Jeff Koz – producer (4, 5, 7, 11), engineer (4, 5, 7, 11)
 Brian McKnight – producer (13)
 Dave Rideau – rhythm section recording (1, 6)
 Al Hemberger – recording (2, 8, 9, 10)
 Chris Wood – vocal recording (2), recording (13)
 Mary Ann Souza – vocal recording assistant (2), recording assistant (13)
 Dan Hart – engineer (4, 5, 7, 11)
 Frank Nadasdy – engineer (4, 5, 7, 11)
 Doug Rider – engineer (4, 5, 7, 11)
 Jeff Chestek – strings recording (8)
 John McGlinchey – strings recording assistant (8)
 Louis Alfred III – percussion recording (12)
 Brad Cole – sax section recording (13)
 Peter Morkran – mixing 
 Tony Flores – mix assistant 
 Seth Waldmann – mix assistant 
 Steve Hall – mastering 
 Wendy Goldstein – A&R  
 Natasha Bishop – project coordinator 
 Andrea Derby – production coordinator 
 Mary Fagot – art direction 
 George Mimnaugh – design 
 Elfie Semotan – photography 
 W.F. Leopold Management, Inc. – management

Studios
 Recorded at Sunset Sound (Hollywood, California); The ColeMine (North Hollywood, California); JHL Sounds and Palisades Zoo (Pacific Palisades, California); BCM Studios (Los Angeles, California); Back Room Studios (Glendale, California); HUM Studios (Santa Monica, California); The Loft Recording Studios (Bronxville, New York); The Lab (New York City, New York); The Studio (Philadelphia, Pennsylvania).
 Mixed at Conway Studios (Hollywood, California).
 Mastered at Future Disc (Hollywood, California).

Charts

References

Dave Koz albums
2003 albums
Albums produced by Brian McKnight
Capitol Records albums
Instrumental albums